Claire Breay, MBE (born 18 October 1968) is an English manuscript curator and medieval historian. She is the Head of Ancient, Medieval and Early Modern Manuscripts at the British Library, where she specializes in Western medieval manuscripts in the Department of Collections.

Education 
Breay studied history and classics for her bachelor's degree at Newnham College, Cambridge, after which she proceeded to do a one-year archival work experience post at the Borthwick Institute for Archives in York, and then trained as an archivist at Aberystwyth University. She did a PhD in medieval history at the Institute of Historical Research in London.

Career 
Breay started her career as an archivist at Lambeth Palace Library for two years after her PhD. She joined the British Library in 1998 as a curator of medieval historical manuscripts. She became the head of the medieval manuscripts section of the Library in 2006. While working in the section, she was in charge of the Codex Sinaiticus Project (2002–2010). She also worked on the acquisition of the St Cuthbert Gospel (2010–2012) and was a co-investigator for the AHRC-funded Magna Carta Project (2012–2015). Breay was lead curator of the 2018 exhibition, Magna Carta: Law, Liberty, Legacy and also the lead curator of the exhibition, Anglo-Saxon Kingdoms: Art, Word, War which is the largest ever exhibition on the history, literature and culture of Anglo-Saxon kingdoms spanning six centuries – from the eclipse of Roman Britain in the 5th century to the Norman Conquest of 1066, as at the time of the exhibition in October 2018. She jointly supervised an AHRC Collaborative Doctoral Partnership student (2015–2018) with Professor Joanna Story of the University of Leicester. She is a Committee member of the Association for Archives and Manuscripts in Research Collections and the Cathedral Libraries and Archives Association.

Awards and recognitions 
In 2017, Breay was awarded an MBE for her services to medieval history.

In 2019, she received the Longman-History Today Trustees' Award for the promotion of history.

Publications 
 
 
 
 ; edited by G. R. C. Davis; revised by Claire Breay, Julian Harrison & David M. Smith 
 ; edited by Claire Breay & Julian Harrison
 ; edited by Claire Breay & Bernard Meehan
 ; edited by Claire Breay & Joanna Story

References 

Living people
1968 births
British women historians
British women curators
British curators
Alumni of Newnham College, Cambridge
Employees of the British Library
English archivists
Female archivists
Members of the Order of the British Empire